Zee Tamil's Sa Re Ga Ma Pa 2009 Challenge was a reality-based Indian singing competition that aired on Tamil language TV channel Zee Tamil. It was designed to be a talent hunt in Tamil Nadu. The top 15 contestants would have an opportunity to perform with celebrity singers during the main stage of the competition. The show was sponsored by Clinic Plus.

Prem Menon, Zee Tamil TV's business head, confirmed that more than 10,000 aspirants auditioned for the competition throughout Tamil Nadu from which 15 contestants were selected for the competition, before the competition was filtered down to 4 finalists. Top 15 contestant performances and the finals were judged by music director M. S. Viswanathan, veteran playback singers Vani Jairam and Nithyasree Mahadevan, and composer Sharreth. The four finalists of the competition were Anand, Bhargavi, Deepak, and Gopalakrishnan. Contestant Anand was crowned the winner of the competition, with contestant Gopalakrishnan being crowned runner-up and contestant Bhargavi being third-placed in the competition.

The show premiered on 22 June 2009, and episodes were telecast between Mondays and Tuesdays each week at 9:00pm. Encore telecasts were aired on Wednesdays and Thursdays at 5:00pm, as well as Saturdays and Sundays each week at 8:00pm..

Debut episodes

Auditions 
Open auditions were held across Tamil Nadu. Prem Menon, Zee Tamil TV's business head, confirmed that more than 10,000 aspirants auditioned for the competition throughout Tamil Nadu from which 15 contestants were selected for the competition.

Competition Rounds

Top 15 contestants and celebrity singers 

The top 15 contestants selected through the main audition rounds and their pairings with the celebrity singers are as follows:

Performances

Introduction Round (27 July 2009 – 28 July 2009) 
 Permanent Compere: Bhavna Balakrishnan
 Judges: M. S. Viswanathan (music director) & Noyal James (music coordinator of music director A. R. Rahman)
 Performances:

Round of 15 (4 August 2009 – 5 August 2009) 
 Permanent Compere: Bhavna Balakrishnan
 Judges: M. S. Viswanathan (music director) & Nithyasree Mahadevan (Carnatic music exponent and veteran playback singer)
 Performances:

This week, 15 contestant-singer duos would each present a duet song in front of judges M.S. Viswanathan and Nityashree Mahadevan. Following the 15 performances which were described as "scintillating" by The Hindu, a contestant-singer duo was eliminated from the competition, leaving 14 playback singers and 14 contestants remaining in the competition.

Round of 14 (10 August 2009 – 11 August 2009) 
 Permanent Compere: Bhavna Balakrishnan
 Judges: M. S. Viswanathan (music director) & Nithyasree Mahadevan (Carnatic music exponent and veteran playback singer)
 Performances:

 – Contestant is eliminated

Round of 13 (17 August 2009 – 18 August 2009) 
 Permanent Compere: Bhavna Balakrishnan
 Judges: M. S. Viswanathan (music director) 
 Performances:

 – Contestant is eliminated

Round of 12 (24 August 2009 – 25 August 2009) 
 Permanent Compere: Bhavna Balakrishnan
 Judges: Nithyasree Mahadevan (Carnatic music exponent & veteran playback singer) & Sharreth (composer)

Round of 11 (31 August 2009 – 1 September 2009) 
 Permanent Compere: Bhavna Balakrishnan
 Judges: Nithyasree Mahadevan (Carnatic music exponent & veteran playback singer) & Sharreth (composer)

Round of 10 (7 September 2009 – 8 September 2009) 
 Permanent Compere: Bhavna Balakrishnan
 Judges: Nithyasree Mahadevan (Carnatic music exponent & veteran playback singer) & Sharreth (composer)

Round of 9 (14 September 2009 – 15 September 2009) 
 Permanent Compere: Bhavna Balakrishnan
 Judges: Vani Jairam (veteran playback singer)

Round of 8: Jai Ho (21 September 2009 – 22 September 2009) 
 Permanent Compere: Bhavna Balakrishnan
 Judges: Vani Jairam (veteran playback singer)

This round required the top 8 to perform songs of an Indian patriotic theme.

Round of 7: Freestyle Round (28 September 2009 – 29 September 2009) 
 Permanent Compere: Bhavna Balakrishnan
 Judges: Vani Jairam (veteran playback singer)

This round was a freestyle contestant which permitted the contestants to perform any song they wish. Contestant Deepak and celebrity Vinaya were selected last, and sang the song "Chippi Irukkuthu" originally sung by S. P. Balasubrahmanyam & S. Janaki, with lyrics penned by Kannadasan and music composed by M. S. Viswanathan from the 1980 film Varumayin Niram Sivappu. Anshu and Mansi remained in the elimination circle to face elimination.

Finals 
The finals were held at Kamarajar Arangam. The competition was judged by renowned music personalities, including music director M. S. Viswanathan, as well as veteran playback singers Vani Jairam and Nithyasree Mahadevan, and composer Sharreth. Celebrity playback singers and eliminated contestants also attended the event to support the finalists. Other celebrity personalities were also in attendance at the event and spotted in the audience, including in particular actor-director Cheran, music composer Ramesh Vinayakam, playback singer Chinmayi, and others.

Performances by the finalists of the competition included the following:

At the conclusion of the performances, the judges selected the winner of the competition.

Contestant Anand was crowned the winner of the competition, with contestant Gopalakrishnan being crowned runner-up and contestant Bhargavi being third-placed in the competition.

References

External links
 Zee Tamizh Official website
 Zee Tamizh on YouTube
 Zee Entertainment Enterprises Limited
 Essel Group

Zee Tamil original programming
Tamil-language singing talent shows
Tamil-language reality television series
2009 Tamil-language television series debuts
Tamil-language game shows
Tamil-language television shows
2009 Tamil-language television series endings
Television shows set in Tamil Nadu